East Grinstead Meridian is an electoral division of West Sussex in the United Kingdom, and returns one member to sit on West Sussex County Council.

Extent
The division covers the northern part of the town of East Grinstead, and came into existence as the result of a boundary review recommended by the Boundary Committee for England, the results of which were accepted by the Electoral Commission in March 2009.

It comprises the following Mid Sussex District wards: East Grinstead Ashplats Ward, East Grinstead Baldwins Ward and the northern part of East Grinstead Town Ward; and falls entirely within the civil parish of East Grinstead.

Election results

2013 Election
Results of the election held on 2 May 2013:

2009 Election
Results of the election held on 4 June 2009:

References
Election Results - West Sussex County Council

External links
 West Sussex County Council
 Election Maps

Electoral Divisions of West Sussex